Bedik (Budik, endonym Ménik, Onik), also Banda, is a Senegambian language of Senegal and Guinea spoken by traditional hunter-gatherers. Other names include Bande, Basari du Bandemba, Bedik, Budik, Manik, Münik, Onik, Tandanke, Tenda, Tendanke.

Writing System

References

External links
 Decree No. 2005-985 of 21 October 2005 relating to the spelling and the separation of words in Ménik via the website of the Journal officiel 
 Bradpiece, S. "‘I had to do something’: Senegal electro star sings to save his language" in The Guardian. Retrieved 13 June 2022.

Fula–Tenda languages
Languages of Senegal